Demar Rose (born 6 December 1996) is a Jamaican footballer who plays as a midfielder for Jamaican club Harbour View and the Jamaica national team.

Career statistics

Club

International

References

External links

 Valparaiso profile
 Demar Rose at National Premier League

1996 births
Living people
Jamaican footballers
Sportspeople from Kingston, Jamaica
Valparaiso University alumni
Association football midfielders
Cavalier F.C. players
Waterhouse F.C. players
Harbour View F.C. players
Valparaiso Crusaders men's soccer players
Lane United FC players
Portmore United F.C. players
National Premier League players
USL League Two players
Jamaica international footballers
Jamaican expatriate footballers
Expatriate soccer players in the United States
Jamaican expatriate sportspeople in the United States